is a Japanese footballer who plays as a goalkeeper for  club Kashima Antlers.

Career
Oki made his professional debut for Kashima Antlers against Sagan Tosu in the J1 League on 8 August 2020 and kept a clean sheet as Kashima won 2–0.

Career statistics

Club
.

References

External links

1999 births
Living people
Japanese footballers
Association football goalkeepers
J1 League players
Kashima Antlers players